Llano del Medio is an unincorporated community and census-designated place in Guadalupe County, New Mexico, United States. Its population was 118 as of the 2010 census, of which 111 people were Hispanic in origin. New Mexico State Road 119 passes through the community.

Geography

Demographics

History
Llano del Medio is one of several settlements located along the Pecos River in the Anton Chico Land Grant created by the government of New Mexico in 1822.  The early inhabitants were Hispanics and genizaros who migrated to LLano del Medio to attain land for growing crops and raising livestock.  Llano del Medio served as one of the eastern outposts of New Mexico to defend against Indian raids on settlements in the Rio Grande valley. Many of the ciboleros (bison hunters) and comancheros (traders with the Plains Indians) of the 19th century came from the settlements along the Pecos River.

Education
Its school district is Santa Rosa Consolidated Schools.

References

Census-designated places in New Mexico
Census-designated places in Guadalupe County, New Mexico